Tiomila or 10-mila is an orienteering race held annually in Sweden since 1945, usually in late April or early May. It is a 10-man relay which includes both night and daytime legs. The women's race consists of five daylight legs. 
Tiomila attracts club teams from all the major orienteering nations. In 2008, both the men's and the women's race consisted of about 350 teams. In 2019, there were 336 women's teams, and 310 men's teams.

The name means "ten mil" (100 km) and refers to the total distance run by each team. The actual distance, however, varies from year to year. The 2015 edition was measured to  along the straight line between the controls.

List of events and winners

Record winners

Men

Women

Gallery

See also
 Jukola relay
 O-Ringen
 List of sporting events in Sweden

References

External links 

 Tiomila
 (YouTube) Tiomila 2008 - video presentation
 The 1978 edition at SVT's open archive 

April sporting events
May sporting events
Orienteering in Sweden
Orienteering relay races
Recurring sporting events established in 1945
1945 establishments in Sweden